Misdeal may refer to

Misdeal (cards)
Maldone 1928 French silent film
Best Revenge (film), 1984 Canadian film
Misdeal play by Basil Woon, made into Recaptured Love, 1930 film
Misdeal, horse, 1843 winner of St. James's Palace Stakes